Norman Leslie Goss (6 June 1915 – 17 March 1983) was an Australian rules football administrator who was heavily involved with the Port Melbourne Football Club and Victorian Football Association throughout his career.

Playing career
Goss played his earlier football for Port Melbourne in the Victorian Football Association, having made his debut in 1937. He finished his VFA career with 85 games, but it would have been more had the league not gone into recess during the second world war. As a result, he spent two seasons in the VFL with Hawthorn, playing five games in 1942 and a further three in 1943. Goss won premierships with Port Melbourne in 1940 and 1941.

Administration
After leaving Hawthorn, Goss continued playing at Port Melbourne until taking up the role of club secretary in 1947, in which he was highly influential. He remained in this role until 1976 and was then the VFA's vice-president through to 1981. From 1981 to 1983 he served as Port Melbourne's president. In the infamous 1967 VFA Grand Final, during his time as secretary, Goss is known to have intervened to stop captain-coach Brian Buckley sending his team off the field to protest against the umpiring. 
 
Following Goss' death in March 1983, the VFA established the Norm Goss Memorial Medal, which has been awarded annually since 1983, to the best player afield in the VFA/VFL grand final.

In the 1970s, the main grandstand of North Port Oval, Port Melbourne's home ground, was named the "Norman L Goss Stand" in his honour.

Family
One of his sons, also named Norm, would likewise start his career at Port Melbourne and play league football for Hawthorn, in addition to South Melbourne. Two more sons, Kevin and Paul, played for South Melbourne and Melbourne respectively.

References

1915 births
Hawthorn Football Club players
Port Melbourne Football Club players
Port Melbourne Football Club administrators
VFA/VFL administrators
Australian rules footballers from Victoria (Australia)
1983 deaths